The Boost is a 1988 American drama film directed by Harold Becker and based on the book  Ludes: A Ballad of the Drug and the Dream  by Ben Stein. It stars James Woods, Sean Young, John Kapelos, Steven Hill, June Chandler and Amanda Blake.

Plot
Lenny Brown (James Woods) is a real-estate hustler looking to strike it rich. He is married to Linda (Sean Young), a paralegal and amateur dancer. The two struggle financially but are deeply committed to each other. Linda vows to stick with her husband until she "falls off the earth."

After Lenny botches a job interview by being over zealous, one of the interviewers, Max Sherman (Steven Hill), sees Lenny's talent as a salesman and offers to move he and his wife to California where he and Max will sell lucrative investments in tax shelters.

Everything is suddenly first-class for Lenny and his wife and they enjoy a very lavish lifestyle. However tax laws abruptly change and they find themselves $700,000 in debt.

Their circumstances become increasingly desperate, worsened by a friend Joel Miller, who introduces both to cocaine for "a boost." Lenny and Linda both become addicted. They lose their home, car and jobs. Linda becomes pregnant, but falls and suffers a miscarriage after using cocaine.

Lenny's life unravels rapidly as cocaine addiction gets the better of him. He gets clean temporarily and conceives one last great business opportunity. However due to anxiety his addiction reasserts itself and he irrationally blows the deal in a fit of anger. This culminates in Lenny severely beating Linda and putting her in the hospital. She is protected from Lenny while recovering and finally breaks with him permanently. She later falls for the doctor who is treating her.

As the end credits roll, we see Lenny still using cocaine in his filthy apartment. He has been relating his tale to a visiting New York friend, blaming others for his failures, and is reduced to a babbling shell of himself.

Cast
 James Woods as Lenny Brown
 Sean Young as Linda Brown
 John Kapelos as Joel Miller
 Steven Hill as Max Sherman
 Kelle Kerr as Rochelle
 John Rothman as Ned Lewis
 Amanda Blake as Barbara
 Barry Jenner as Billy

Reception
The Boost earned mixed reviews from critics. Roger Ebert gave the film three-and-a-half of a possible four stars in a Dec. 28, 1988 Chicago Sun-Times review, calling the film "one of the most convincing and horrifying portraits of drug addiction I've ever seen." Leonard Maltin was not so kind, however, giving the film only one-and-a-half of a possible four stars: "A misfire that's on the screen for 30 minutes before you even realize that it *is* anti-drug...As with Jack Nicholson in The Shining, it's hard to distinguish the 'before' Lenny from the 'after'."

References

External links
 
 
 

1988 films
1988 romantic drama films
Films directed by Harold Becker
Films scored by Stanley Myers
American romantic drama films
1980s English-language films
1980s American films